French Hainaut is one of two areas in France that form the département du Nord, making up its eastern part. It corresponds roughly with the Arrondissement of Avesnes-sur-Helpe (east), the Arrondissement of Cambrai (south-west) and the Arrondissement of Valenciennes (north-west).

Until the 17th century, it was an integral part of the County of Hainaut, ruled by the House of Valois-Burgundy and later by the House of Habsburg. In a series of wars between France and Spain, this southern part of Hainaut was conquered by France, together with the adjacent Cambrésis, or Bishopric of Cambrai, to its south-west, and southern Flanders, which borders the English Channel, to its west. Together, these formed the French province of Flanders which, following the French Revolution, became the new Nord département.

References

 Gilbert of Mons, Chronicle of Hainaut, Boydell Press, 2005.

County of Hainaut
Former provinces of France